Duetá is the seventh compilation album by Marika Gombitová, released on OPUS in 2010.

Track listing

Official releases
 2010: Duetá, CD, OPUS #91 2825

Credits and personnel

 Marika Gombitová - lead vocal, writer
 Miroslav Žbirka - music, lead vocal, co-producer
 Karel Gott
 Ján Lehotský - music, lead vocal
 Pavol Hammel - music, lead vocal
 Marián Varga - music 
 Róbert Grigorov - lead vocal
 Ľudovít Nosko - lead vocal
 Václav Patejdl - music, lead vocal
 Richard Müller - lead vocal

 Dežo Ursiny - music
 Marie Rottrová - lead vocal
 Miroslav Jevčák - lead vocal
 Kamil Peteraj - lyrics
 Boris Filan - lyrics
 Ali Brezovský - lyrics
 Ján Štrasser - lyrics
 Ján Lauko - producer
 Milan Vašica - producer
 Peter Smolinský - producer

References

General

Specific

External links 
 

2010 compilation albums
Marika Gombitová compilation albums